The Sagittarius Dwarf Irregular Galaxy (SagDIG) is a dwarf galaxy in the constellation of Sagittarius. (SagDIG should not be confused with the Sagittarius Dwarf Spheroidal Galaxy, SagDEG, a satellite galaxy of the Milky Way discovered decades later in the same constellation.) It lies about 3.4 million light-years away. It was discovered by Cesarsky et al. on a photographic plate taken for the ESO (B) Atlas on 13 June 1977 using the ESO 1 meter Schmidt telescope.

The SagDIG is thought to be the member of the Local Group most remote from the Local Group's barycenter. It is only slightly outside the zero-velocity surface of the Local Group.

SagDIG is a much more luminous galaxy than the Aquarius Dwarf and it has been through a prolonged period of star formation. This has resulted in it containing a rich intermediate-age population of stars. Twenty-seven candidate carbon stars have been identified inside SagDIG. Analysis shows that the underlying stellar population of SagDIG is metal-poor (at least [Fe/H] ≤ −1.3). Further, the population is young, with the most likely average age between 4 and 8 billion years for the dominant population.

References

External links

 

Dwarf irregular galaxies
Irregular galaxies
Sagittarius (constellation)
Local Group
63287
Astronomical objects discovered in 1977